In the area of mathematics known as functional analysis, a reflexive space is a locally convex topological vector space (TVS) for which the canonical evaluation map from  into its bidual (which is the strong dual of the strong dual of ) is an isomorphism of TVSs. 
Since a normable TVS is reflexive if and only if it is semi-reflexive, every normed space (and so in particular, every Banach space)  is reflexive if and only if the canonical evaluation map from  into its bidual is surjective; 
in this case the normed space is necessarily also a Banach space. 
In 1951, R. C. James discovered a Banach space, now known as James' space, that is  reflexive but is nevertheless isometrically isomorphic to its bidual (any such isomorphism is thus necessarily  the canonical evaluation map). 

Reflexive spaces play an important role in the general theory of locally convex TVSs and in the theory of Banach spaces in particular.  Hilbert spaces are prominent examples of reflexive Banach spaces.  Reflexive Banach spaces are often characterized by their geometric properties.

Definition 

Definition of the bidual

this topology is also called the strong dual topology and it is the "default" topology placed on a continuous dual space (unless another topology is specified). 
If  is a normed space, then  is the continuous dual space of the Banach space  with its usual norm topology. 

Definitions of the evaluation map and reflexive spaces

since  is necessarily continuous, it follows that  
Call  semi-reflexive if  is bijective (or equivalently, surjective) and we call  reflexive if in addition  is an isomorphism of TVSs.
A normable space is reflexive if and only if it is semi-reflexive or equivalently, if and only if the evaluation map is surjective.

Reflexive Banach spaces 

The dual  is a normed space (a Banach space to be precise), and its dual normed space  is called bidual space for  The bidual consists of all continuous linear functionals  and is equipped with the norm  dual to  Each vector  generates a scalar function  by the formula:

called evaluation map, that is linear. It follows from the Hahn–Banach theorem that  is injective and preserves norms:

that is,  maps  isometrically onto its image  in   Furthermore, the image  is closed in  but it need not be equal to 

A normed space  is called reflexive if it satisfies the following equivalent conditions:
 the evaluation map  is surjective,
 the evaluation map  is an isometric isomorphism of normed spaces,
 the evaluation map  is an isomorphism of normed spaces.
A reflexive space  is a Banach space, since  is then isometric to the Banach space

Remark 

A Banach space  is reflexive if it is linearly isometric to its bidual under this canonical embedding  James' space is an example of a non-reflexive space which is linearly isometric to its bidual. Furthermore, the image of James' space under the canonical embedding  has codimension one in its bidual.

A Banach space  is called quasi-reflexive (of order ) if the quotient  has finite dimension

Examples 

 Every finite-dimensional normed space is reflexive, simply because in this case, the space, its dual and bidual all have the same linear dimension, hence the linear injection  from the definition is bijective, by the rank–nullity theorem.
 The Banach space  of scalar sequences tending to 0 at infinity, equipped with the supremum norm, is not reflexive.
 All Hilbert spaces are reflexive, as are the Lp spaces  for  More generally: all uniformly convex Banach spaces are reflexive according to the Milman–Pettis theorem. The  and  spaces are not reflexive (unless they are finite dimensional, which happens for example when  is a measure on a finite set).

Properties 

If a Banach space  is isomorphic to a reflexive Banach space  then  is reflexive.

Every closed linear subspace of a reflexive space is reflexive.  The continuous dual of a reflexive space is reflexive.  Every quotient of a reflexive space by a closed subspace is reflexive.

Let  be a Banach space. The following are equivalent.
 The space  is reflexive.
(This is known as Kakutani's Theorem.)
 Every bounded sequence in  has a weakly convergent subsequence.

Since norm-closed convex subsets in a Banach space are weakly closed, 
it follows from the third property that closed bounded convex subsets of a reflexive space  are weakly compact.  Thus, for every decreasing sequence of non-empty closed bounded convex subsets of  the intersection is non-empty.  As a consequence, every continuous convex function  on a closed convex subset  of  such that the set

is non-empty and bounded for some real number  attains its minimum value on 

The closest point  is unique when  is uniformly convex.

A reflexive Banach space is separable if and only if its continuous dual is separable.  This follows from the fact that for every normed space  separability of the continuous dual  implies separability of

Super-reflexive space 

Informally, a super-reflexive Banach space  has the following property: given an arbitrary Banach space  if all finite-dimensional subspaces of  have a very similar copy sitting somewhere in  then  must be reflexive.  By this definition, the space  itself must be reflexive.  As an elementary example, every Banach space  whose two dimensional subspaces are isometric to subspaces of  satisfies the parallelogram law, hence 
 is a Hilbert space, therefore  is reflexive.  So  is super-reflexive.

The formal definition does not use isometries, but almost isometries.  A Banach space  is finitely representable 

Every Banach space is finitely representable in   The Lp space  is finitely representable in 

allows for a concise definition: the Banach space  is super-reflexive when its ultrapowers are reflexive.

James proved that a space is super-reflexive if and only if its dual is super-reflexive.

Finite trees in Banach spaces 

One of James' characterizations of super-reflexivity uses the growth of separated trees.

that are the children of vertices of level   In addition to the tree structure, it is required here that each vector that is an internal vertex of the tree be the midpoint between its two children:

Given a positive real number  the tree is said to be -separated if for every internal vertex, the two children are -separated in the given space norm:

Theorem.
The Banach space  is super-reflexive if and only if for every  there is a number  such that every -separated tree contained in the unit ball of  has height less than 

Uniformly convex spaces are super-reflexive.
Let  be uniformly convex, with modulus of convexity  and let  be a real number in   By the properties of the modulus of convexity, a -separated tree of height  contained in the unit ball, must have all points of level  contained in the ball of radius  By induction, it follows that all points of level  are contained in the ball of radius

If the height  was so large that 

then the two points  of the first level could not be -separated, contrary to the assumption.  This gives the required bound  function of  only.

Using the tree-characterization, Enflo proved 
that super-reflexive Banach spaces admit an equivalent uniformly convex norm.  Trees in a Banach space are a special instance of vector-valued martingales.  Adding techniques from scalar martingale theory, Pisier improved Enflo's result by showing that a super-reflexive space  admits an equivalent uniformly convex norm for which the modulus of convexity satisfies, for some constant  and some real number

Reflexive locally convex spaces 

The notion of reflexive Banach space can be generalized to topological vector spaces in the following way.

Let  be a topological vector space over a number field  (of real numbers  or complex numbers ). Consider its strong dual space  which consists of all continuous linear functionals  and is equipped with the strong topology  that is,, the topology of uniform convergence on bounded subsets in  The space  is a topological vector space (to be more precise, a locally convex space), so one can consider its strong dual space  which is called the strong bidual space for  It consists of all continuous linear functionals  and is equipped with the strong topology  Each vector  generates a map  by the following formula:

This is a continuous linear functional on  that is,,  This induces a map called the evaluation map:

This map is linear. If  is locally convex, from the Hahn–Banach theorem it follows that  is injective and open (that is, for each neighbourhood of zero  in  there is a neighbourhood of zero  in  such that ). But it can be non-surjective and/or discontinuous.

A locally convex space  is called 
 semi-reflexive if the evaluation map   is surjective (hence bijective),
 reflexive if the evaluation map   is surjective and continuous (in this case   is an isomorphism of topological vector spaces).

Semireflexive spaces

Characterizations 

If  is a Hausdorff locally convex space then the following are equivalent:
 is semireflexive;
If linear form on  that continuous when  has the strong dual topology, then it is continuous when  has the weak topology; 
 is barreled; 
 with the weak topology  is quasi-complete.

Characterizations of reflexive spaces 

If  is a Hausdorff locally convex space then the following are equivalent:
 is reflexive;
 is semireflexive and infrabarreled;
 is semireflexive and barreled;
 is semireflexive and quasibarrelled.

If  is a normed space then the following are equivalent:
 is reflexive;
The closed unit ball is compact when  has the weak topology 

Sufficient conditions 

Normed spaces

A normed space that is semireflexive is a reflexive Banach space.
A closed vector subspace of a reflexive Banach space is reflexive.

Topological vector spaces

If a barreled locally convex Hausdorff space is semireflexive then it is reflexive.

The strong dual of a reflexive space is reflexive.Every Montel space is reflexive. And the strong dual of a Montel space is a Montel space (and thus is reflexive).

Properties 

A locally convex Hausdorff reflexive space is barrelled.
If  is a normed space then  is an isometry onto a closed subspace of  This isometry can be expressed by:

Then the unit ball of  
 
is dense in the unit ball 
 

Examples 

 Every finite-dimensional Hausdorff topological vector space is reflexive, because  is bijective by linear algebra, and because there is a unique Hausdorff vector space topology on a finite dimensional vector space.
 A normed space  is reflexive as a normed space if and only if it is reflexive as a locally convex space. This follows from the fact that for a normed space  its dual normed space  coincides as a topological vector space with the strong dual space  As a corollary, the evaluation map  coincides with the evaluation map  and the following conditions become equivalent:
 is a reflexive normed space (that is,  is an isomorphism of normed spaces),
 is a reflexive locally convex space (that is,  is an isomorphism of topological vector spaces),
 is a semi-reflexive locally convex space (that is,  is surjective).
A (somewhat artificial) example of a semi-reflexive space that is not reflexive is obtained as follows: let  be an infinite dimensional reflexive Banach space, and let  be the topological vector space  that is, the vector space  equipped with the weak topology.
Montel spaces are reflexive locally convex topological vector spaces. In particular, the following functional spaces frequently used in functional analysis are reflexive locally convex spaces:
 the space  of smooth functions on arbitrary (real) smooth manifold  and its strong dual space  of distributions with compact support on 
 the space  of smooth functions with compact support on arbitrary (real) smooth manifold  and its strong dual space  of distributions on 
 the space  of holomorphic functions on arbitrary complex manifold  and its strong dual space  of analytic functionals on 

Counter-examples

There exists a non-reflexive locally convex TVS whose strong dual is reflexive.

Other types of reflexivity 

A stereotype space, or polar reflexive space, is defined as a topological vector space (TVS) satisfying a similar condition of reflexivity, but with the topology of uniform convergence on totally bounded subsets (instead of bounded subsets) in the definition of dual space  More precisely, a TVS  is called polar reflexive or stereotype if the evaluation map into the second dual space

is an isomorphism of topological vector spaces.

In contrast to the classical reflexive spaces the class Ste of stereotype spaces is very wide (it contains, in particular, all Fréchet spaces and thus, all Banach spaces), it forms a closed monoidal category, and it admits standard operations (defined inside of Ste) of constructing new spaces, like taking closed subspaces, quotient spaces, projective and injective limits, the space of operators, tensor products, etc. The category Ste have applications in duality theory for non-commutative groups.

See also 

 
 A generalization which has some of the properties of reflexive spaces and includes many spaces of practical importance is the concept of Grothendieck space.

References

Citations

General references 

  .
 
 
 .
   
 
 
  
   
 
  
  

Banach spaces
Duality theories